Cecil James "Archie" Andrews (1 November 1930 – July 1986) was an English footballer who played as a wing half in the Football League for Crystal Palace and Queens Park Rangers. He also played non-league football for Sittingbourne.

Playing career
Andrews began his career with Portsmouth but did not make a League appearance for the club before signing for Crystal Palace in June 1952. He made his debut on 7 September 1952 in an away 5–0 defeat to Bristol City. He kept his place for the following game but did not appear again until February 1953. He went on to make a total of 104 League appearances for Palace, over four seasons, scoring 11 goals.

In June 1956, Andrews moved on to Queens Park Rangers, for whom he made a total of 58 League appearances, over the next two seasons (scoring once), before moving into non-league football with Sittingbourne.

Andrews was nicknamed "Archie" after the comic book character of the period.

Cecil Andrews died in July 1986 aged 55.

References

External links

Cecil Andrews at holmesdale.net

1930 births
1986 deaths
English footballers
People from Alton, Hampshire
Portsmouth F.C. players
Crystal Palace F.C. players
Queens Park Rangers F.C. players
Sittingbourne F.C. players
English Football League players
Association football midfielders